Ig gamma-2 chain C region is a protein that in humans is encoded by the IGHG2 gene.

References

Further reading